Gleb Zheleznikov (born 31 July 1997) is a Belarusian professional footballer who plays for Dnepr Mogilev.

References

External links 
 
 

1997 births
Living people
Belarusian footballers
People from Orsha
Sportspeople from Vitebsk Region
Association football midfielders
FC Belshina Bobruisk players
FC Orsha players
FC Osipovichi players
FC Volna Pinsk players
FC Dnepr Mogilev players